Andrzej Niemirowicz (1462–1540) was a Lithuanian-Ruthenian noble, soldier and statesman. In 1514, he became voivode of Kiev, and in 1535, he became the second hetman of the Grand Duchy of Lithuania.

References

1462 births
1540 deaths
Field Hetmans of the Grand Duchy of Lithuania